Sardheri (also known as Sardhero or Sardheray) is a town located in Charsadda District in the North West Frontier Province of Pakistan.

Location 
Sardheri is situated on the Charsadda-Mardan road, 6 miles from Charsadda city towards East or 15 miles from Mardan towards West. From the Motorway charsadda interchange it is located about 6 km. The land of this town is very fertile, where three crops can be grown in a year. Major crops grown here are sugar cane, tobacco, wheat and many vegetables. As the lands held by the owners have been subdivided with subsequent divisions within families; a new trend of cultivating vegetables has been introduced.

Tribes 
Most of the people of Sardheri are Pakhtuns. The majorities are from the known tribes of DURRANI'S(da Rahimy Khanan), KAKAKHAILS [KAMBAR KHEL MIANGAN] Ghani khel(Anni khel), Mohmand, Muhammad Zai, Yousaf Zai,  Kanan khel, Utman Khel, Umar Zai, painda khel and others.

External links 
 www.sardheri.com
 Sardheri on Google Maps

Charsadda District, Pakistan